Rami Yaslam Al-Jaberi (born 11 June 1981) is an Emirati footballer.

External links
 Rami Statistics At Goalzz.com
Rami Yaslam Player Information, Al Ain Sports & Cultural Club

1981 births
Living people
Emirati footballers
Al Ain FC players
Dubai CSC players
2004 AFC Asian Cup players
UAE Pro League players
Association football midfielders
United Arab Emirates international footballers